Events from the year 1642 in Sweden

Incumbents
 Monarch – Christina

Events

 Battle of Schweidnitz.
 23 October - Battle of Breitenfeld (1642), the Second Battle of Breitenfeld, also known as the First Battle of Leipzig, was a decisive victory for the Swedish army under the command of Field Marshal Lennart Torstenson over an Imperial Army under the command of Archduke Leopold Wilhelm of Austria and his deputy Ottavio Piccolomini, Duke of Amalfi.
 The Beggar regulation of 1642 regulates the Swedish poor relief until the Poor Care Law of 1847.

Births

 5 November - Nils Gyldenstolpe (1642–1709), count, official and diplomat (died 1709) 
 Anna Agriconia Åkerhielm, writer and traveller (died 1698)

Deaths

  Simon de la Vallée, French-Swedish architect (died 1590) 
 Ebba Ryning, court official (born 1595)
 Christina Natt och Dag, court official (born 1580)

References

 
Years of the 17th century in Sweden
Sweden